Chorlton New Mills is a former large cotton spinning complex in Cambridge Street, Chorlton-on-Medlock, Manchester, England which has since been converted to apartments. 

The complex was initially established in 1814 by members of the Birley family. The original block was an 8-storey building, including two storeys below ground level, of 20 bays and is the oldest surviving fireproof mill in Greater Manchester. It was powered by a 100hp Boulton and Watt beam engine and illuminated by gas produced in the basement, where it was stored in three gasholders. It stands adjacent to Chorlton Old Mill, rebuilt in 1866 on the site of Robert Owen's 1795 Chorlton Twist Mill.

An extra wing was added to the new mill in 1818, originally powered from the main building but later provided with its own external engine house. In 1829 a 600 loom weaving shed was added, which has since been demolished. In 1845 the two existing spinning blocks were connected by the building of a third 6-bay fireproof block with an internal engine house. The basements of the complex were connected to those of nearby mills by a system of tunnels.

In 1860 the site was taken over by Charles Macintosh and used, together with other nearby mills, for the production of rubberised fabric. It has since been converted to living accommodation.

Together with its metal-bound chimney, built in 1853, it is a Grade II listed building.

See also

Listed buildings in Manchester-M1
Hugh Birley
Hugh Hornby Birley

References

Textile mills in Manchester
Brick buildings and structures
Cotton industry in England
Former textile mills in the United Kingdom
Grade II listed buildings in Manchester
Grade II listed industrial buildings